Fterrë is a village in the former commune of Lukovë, Vlorë County, southern Albania. At the 2015 local government reform it became part of the municipality Himarë. It is located in a side valley of the Albanian Riviera, within the region of Kurvelesh and 10 km northeast of Borsh. The village is inhabited by Muslim Albanians.

Geography 
Fterrë is located 200 to 250 m above sea level on the western slope of Mt Lajthi (1418 m). The highest peak of the village's area is that Gjeshnikoshi (1478 m) and the lowest that of Leka (315 m). There are also numerous karst springs and six caves. A road from Borsh to Vlorë passes through the village.

History
Fterrë was first mentioned in 1431, in the Sûreti defter-i sancak-i Arvanid (defter of the Albanian Sanjak). At that time, it consisted of twelve – affluent – families. In 1583, the Ottoman Defter mentioned the place as Ifteran with 24 extended families and in later years is listed with 45 extended families. During the early Ottoman era it was part of the nahiye of Sopot, while in the 16th century it was incorporated into the kaza of Kurvelesh.

In the Albanian Revolt of 1910 the çetë (military unit) from Fterrë was led Lazo Kofina.

In 1914 the village was destroyed during the advance of army of the Kingdom of Greece. The villagers, who had fled the vicinity of Vlorë, rebuilt the village in 1916 when the Greek army retreated from Albania. In autumn 1916 the village's school was rebuilt and Selim Gjonika became its first teacher. 
In the Vlora War in 1920 the band of Fterra took part under the leadership of Xhafer Shehu.

In World War II part of the village was destroyed by Italian artillery fire during the Greco-Italian War. In 1942 the first council of the National Liberation Movement in the village and its volunteer platoon were founded under Hiqmet Çallo. In total during World War II six volunteer soldiers from Fterrë were killed and forty houses damaged and destroyed.

Demographics

Notable people
Nafiz Bezhani,  jurist, politician and writer. 
Muzafer Korkuti, archaeologist and Vice President of the Academy of Sciences of Albania.
Jakup Mato, head of Centre of Art Studies of the Academy of Sciences of Albania.

References
Notes;

Sources;
Halil İnalcik: Hicrî 835 tarihli Sûret-i defter-i sancak-i Arvanid. (= Türk Tarih Kurumu yayınlarından. 14,1a). Ankara 1987 (Albania, Sandschak Vlora)
 Karl Kaser, Robert Pichler, und Stephanie Schwandner-Sievers (Hrsg.): Die weite Welt und das Dorf. Albanische Emigration am Ende des 20. Jahrhunderts. In: Zur Kunde Südosteuropas. Albanologische Studien, Band 3. Böhlau Verlag, Wien 2002,

External links
 Fterra në Fotografi – Foto from Fterra
 newspaper „Fterra jonë“
 Literaturdatenbank Fachportal-Pädagogik.de zu Die weite Welt und das Dorf

Archaeological sites in Albania
Populated places in Himara
Villages in Vlorë County